Heilbronn Power Station is a coal-fired power station in Heilbronn, Germany. It is operated by EnBW Kraftwerke AG, until 1997 by EVS, and has seven units. Specifically, Unit 7 is the largest coal-fired unit used by EnBW. The capacity of the three units is 950 MW, two units with a capacity of approx. 200 MW are in cold reserve.  The power station's two flue gas stacks are the highest structures in Heilbronn and are recognizable as landmarks from far away.

References

External links

 Location on Google Maps

Coal-fired power stations in Germany
Buildings and structures in Heilbronn
Economy of Heilbronn